Atyoida is a genus of freshwater shrimp in the family Atyidae. There are four species in the genus, each endemic to a different island group. The type species, Atyoida bisulcata, is endemic to Hawaiʻi and described by John Witt Randall in 1840.

Species 
The following classification follows De Grave & Fransen (2011), with subsequent addition.
Atyoida bisulcata Randall, 1840
Atyoida pilipes (Newport, 1847)
Atyoida serrata (Spence Bate, 1888)
Atyoida tahitensis Stimpson, 1860

References

Taxa named by John Witt Randall
Fauna of Hawaii
Caridea
Crustaceans described in 1840
Decapod genera